The 1892 Pittsburgh Athletic Club football season  was their third season in existence. The team finished with a record of 3–3–1. This season also marked the first recorded accounts of professional players being used in American football.

Schedule

Game notes

References

Pittsburgh Athletic Club
Pittsburgh Athletic Club football seasons
Pittsburgh Athletic Club football